Football Club Samurzakan Gal is a football club in the city of Gali, in the state of Abkhazia that competes in the Abkhazian Premier League.
The colors of your escode are white, blue and black.

History
Founded on 1999 in the city of Gali in the state of Abkhazia, the club is affiliated with the Football Federation of Abkhazia.

The club played in the 2020 edition of the Abkhazia League. And the competition ended in seventh place.

References 

Association football clubs established in 1999